This is a list of popular science books concerning evolution, sorted by surname of the author.

B 

 Paul M. Bingham and Joanne Souza (2009). Death from a Distance and the Birth of a Humane Universe: Human Evolution, Behavior, History, and Your Future.

C 
 Sean B. Carroll (2006). The Making of the Fittest: DNA and the Ultimate Forensic Record of Evolution.
 Sean B. Carroll (2005). Endless Forms Most Beautiful: The New Science of Evo Devo.
 Brian Charlesworth and Deborah Charlesworth (2003). Evolution: A Very Short Introduction.
 Matteo Conti (2008). The Selfish Cell: An evolutionary defeat.
 Jerry Coyne (2009). Why Evolution Is True.

D 
 Charles Darwin (1859). The Origin of Species.
 Charles Darwin (1871). The Descent of Man.
 Richard Dawkins (1976). The Selfish Gene.
 Richard Dawkins (1982). The Extended Phenotype.
 Richard Dawkins (1986). The Blind Watchmaker.
 Richard Dawkins (1995). River out of Eden.
 Richard Dawkins (1996). Climbing Mount Improbable.
 Richard Dawkins (2004). The Ancestor's Tale.
 Richard Dawkins (2009). The Greatest Show on Earth: The Evidence for Evolution.
 Daniel Dennett (1995). Darwin's Dangerous Idea.
 Daniel Dennett (2003). Freedom Evolves.
 Jared Diamond (1992). The Third Chimpanzee: The Evolution and Future of the Human Animal 
 Theodosius Dobzhansky (1937; 2nd ed 1941; 3rd ed 1951). Genetics and the Origin of Species.

E 
 Niles Eldredge (2001). The Triumph of Evolution: and the Failure of Creationism.

F 
 Daniel J. Fairbanks (2007). Relics of Eden: The Powerful Evidence of Evolution in Human DNA.

G 
 Ann Gibbons (2007). The First Human: The Race to Discover Our Earliest Ancestors.
 Stephen Jay Gould (1977). Ever Since Darwin.
 Stephen Jay Gould (1989). Wonderful Life: The Burgess Shale and the Nature of History.
 Stephen Jay Gould (1996). Full House: The Spread of Excellence from Plato to Darwin.

H 
 Marc Hauser (2006). Moral Minds.
 Jay Hosler (2011). Evolution: The Story of Life on Earth.
Julian Huxley (1942). Evolution: The Modern Synthesis.
 Thomas Henry Huxley (1863). Evidence as to Man's Place in Nature.

J 
 Donald Johansson (2006). From Lucy to Language: Revised, Updated, and Expanded.
 Shaun  Johnston (2017). Re-thinking What it Means We Evolved: A new framework for universal moral values.
 Shaun  Johnston (2020). Are You wonderful? Good Science Says, Yes: How to tell good science from bad.
 Alison Jolly (2001). Lucy's Legacy: Sex and Intelligence in Human Evolution.
 Steve Jones (1995). The Language of the Genes.
 David Starr Jordan (1901). The Blood of the Nation: A Study in the Decay of Races by the Survival of the Unfit.
 Joseph Jordania (2006). Who Asked the First Question?: The Origins of Human Choral Singing, Intelligence, Language and Speech.
 Joseph Jordania (2011). Why do People Sing? Music in Human Evolution.

K 
 Marc W. Kirschner and John C. Gerhart (2006). The Plausibility of Life: Resolving Darwin's Dilemma.
 Peter Kropotkin (1902). Mutual Aid: A Factor of Evolution.
 Arik Kershenbaum (2020). The Zoologist's Guide to the Galaxy - What Animals on Earth Reveal about Aliens – and Ourselves.

L 
 Nick Lane (2010). Life Ascending: The Ten Great Inventions of Evolution.
 Gabriel E. Lasker (1961). The Evolution of Man: A Brief Introduction to Physical Anthropology.
 Daniel Levitin (2008). The World in Six Songs: How the Musical Brain Created Human Nature.

M 
 John Maynard Smith (1958). The Theory of Evolution.
 John Maynard Smith (1972). On Evolution.
 John Maynard Smith (1978). The Evolution of Sex.
 John Maynard Smith (1982). Evolution and the Theory of Games.
 John Maynard Smith (1989). Evolutionary Genetics.
 John Maynard Smith and Eörs Szathmáry (1997). The Major Transitions in Evolution.
 John Maynard Smith and Eörs Szathmáry (1999). The Origins of Life: From the Birth of Life to the Origin of Language.
 Ernst Mayr (2002). What Evolution Is.
 Ernst Mayr (2007). One Long Argument: Charles Darwin and the Genesis of Modern Evolutionary Thought.
 Kenneth R. Miller (2000). Finding Darwin's God: A Scientist's Search for Common Ground Between God and Evolution.
 Kenneth R. Miller (2008). Only a Theory: Evolution and the Battle for America's Soul.

N 
 National Academies of Science (2008). Science, Evolution, and Creationism.    
 Bill Nye (2014). Undeniable: Evolution and the Science of Creation.

P 
 Jean-Baptiste De Panafieu (2011). Evolution.
 Donald Prothero (2006). After the Dinosaurs: The Age of Mammals.
 Donald Prothero (2007). Evolution: What the Fossils Say and Why It Matters.
 Steven Pinker (1997). How the Mind Works.

R 
 Matt Ridley (1994). The Red Queen: Sex and the Evolution of Human Nature.
 Matt Ridley (1997). The Origins of Virtue.
 Matt Ridley (1999). Genome: The Autobiography of a Species in 23 Chapters.
 Matt Ridley (2003). Nature Via Nurture: Genes, Experience, and What Makes Us Human.
 Reprinted as The Agile Gene: How Nature Turns on Nurture.
 Michael Ruse (1998). Taking Darwin Seriously: A Naturalistic Approach to Philosophy.
 Michael Ruse (1999). The Darwinian Revolution: Science Red in Tooth and Claw.
 Michael Ruse (2001). The Evolution Wars: A Guide to the Debates.
 Michael Ruse (2001). Mystery of Mysteries: Is Evolution a Social Construction?.
 Michael Ruse (2006). Darwinism and Its Discontents.
 Michael Ruse (2006). Evolution-Creation Struggle.

S 
 Carl Sagan (1977). The Dragons of Eden: Speculations on the Evolution of Human Intelligence.
 Neil Shubin (2008). Your Inner Fish: A Journey into the 3.5-Billion-Year History of the Human Body.
 John Skoyles and Dorion Sagan (2002). Up from Dragons: The evolution of human intelligence.
 Cameron M. Smith and Charles Sullivan (2006). The Top 10 Myths About Evolution.

T

W 
 Nicholas Wade (2006). Before the Dawn: Recovering the Lost History of Our Ancestors.
 Jonathan Weiner (1994). The Beak of the Finch: A Story of Evolution in Our Time.
 David Sloan Wilson (2007). Evolution for Everyone: How Darwin's Theory Can Change the Way We Think About Our Lives.
 David Sloan Wilson (2019). This View of Life: Completing the Darwinian Revolution
 Bernard Wood (2006). Human Evolution: A Very Short Introduction.

Z 
 Carl Zimmer (2001). Evolution: The Triumph of an Idea.
 Carl Zimmer (2005). Smithsonian Intimate Guide to Human Origins.

Evolution-related lists
 

Lists of books